"A Place in the Sun" is a song by American rock group Pablo Cruise from their album of the same name, A Place in the Sun, in 1977. It was released as a single and reached #42 on the Billboard Hot 100 and #36 in Canada.

External links
 

1977 songs
1977 singles
Pablo Cruise songs
A&M Records singles